Poetry took numerous forms in medieval Europe, for example, lyric and epic poetry.  The troubadours and the minnesänger are known for their lyric poetry about courtly love.

Among the most famous of secular poetry is Carmina Burana, a manuscript collection of 254 poems. Twenty-four poems of Carmina Burana were later set to music by German composer Carl Orff in 1936.

Examples of medieval poetry
Old English religious poetry includes the poem Christ by Cynewulf and the poem The Dream of the Rood, preserved in both manuscript form and on the Ruthwell Cross. We do have some secular poetry; in fact a great deal of medieval literature was written in verse, including the Old English epic Beowulf. Scholars are fairly sure, based on a few fragments and on references in historic texts, that much lost secular poetry was set to music, and was spread by traveling minstrels, or bards, across Europe. Thus, the few poems written eventually became ballads or lays, and never made it to being recited without song or other music.

Medieval Latin literature 
In  medieval Latin, while verse in the old quantitative meters continued to be written, a new more popular form called the sequence arose, which was based on accentual metres in which metrical feet were based on stressed syllables rather than vowel length. These metres were associated with Christian hymnody.

However, much secular poetry was also written in Latin. Some poems and songs, like the Gambler's Mass (officio lusorum) from the Carmina Burana, were parodies of Christian hymns, while others were student melodies: folksongs, love songs and drinking ballads. The famous commercium song Gaudeamus igitur is one example. There are also a few narrative poems of the period, such as the unfinished epic Ruodlieb, which tells us the story of a knight's adventures.

Topics
Carmina Burana
Cambridge Songs
goliard
Hiberno-Latin
Gregorian chant
Dies Irae
Pange Lingua

Medieval Latin poets
Adam of Saint Victor
St Ambrose
St Thomas Aquinas
The Archpoet
St Bernard of Cluny
St Bonaventure
St Columba
Dante Alighieri
St Hildegard of Bingen
Hrabanus Maurus
Paul the Deacon
Petrarch
Peter Abelard
Peter of Blois
Thomas of Celano
Walafrid Strabo
Walter of Châtillon
Chaucer
Gottfried von Hagenau

Medieval vernacular literature
One of the features of the Renaissance which marked the end of the medieval period is the rise in the use of the vernacular or the language of the common people for literature.  The compositions in these local languages were often about the legends and history of the areas in which they were written which gave the people some form of national identity.  Epic poems, sagas, chansons de geste and acritic songs (songs of heroic deeds) were often about the great men, real or imagined, and their achievements like Arthur, Charlemagne and El Cid.

The earliest recorded European vernacular literature is that written in the Irish language. Given that Ireland had escaped absorption into the Roman empire, this had time to develop into a highly sophisticated literature with well-documented formal rules and highly organised bardic schools. The result was a large body of prose and verse recording the ancient myths and sagas of the Gaelic-speaking people of the island, as well as poems on religious, political and geographical themes and a body of nature poetry.

The formality which Latin had gained through its long written history was often not present in the vernaculars which began producing poetry, and so new techniques and structures emerged, often derived from oral literature.  This is particularly noticeable in the Germanic languages, which, unlike the Romance languages, are not direct descendants from Latin. Alliterative verse, where many of the stressed words in each line start with the same sound, was often used in the local poetry of that time.  Other features of vernacular poetry of this time include kennings, internal rhyme, and slant rhyme. Indeed, Latin poetry traditionally used meter rather than rhyme and only began to adopt rhyme after being influenced by these new poems.

Romance languages

Old French 
trouvère
Anglo-Norman literature
Roman de la Rose

The Matter of France
chanson de geste
paladin
Charlemagne
Charles Martel
Saracen
Chanson de Roland
Garin de Monglane
Doon de Mayence
Huon de Bordeaux
Renaud de Montauban

The Matter of Britain
King Arthur
Camelot
chivalry

The Matter of Rome
Roman d'Alixandre (Alexander Romance)
Roman de Troie
Roman de Thèbes
Eneas
Troilus and Criseyde

Provençal
troubadour
courtly love
Provençal literature

Catalan
Ausiàs March
Ramon Llull
Andreu Febrer

Italian
Dante Alighieri
The Divine Comedy
Petrarch
Francis of Assisi

Spanish
Juan Ruiz
El Cid

Galician-Portuguese
João Zorro
Martim Codax
Paio Gomes Charinho

French
Wace
Chrétien de Troyes
Marie de France
Guillaume de Machaut
Jean de Meung
Christine de Pizan

Medieval Georgian Poetry
Shota Rustaveli
The Knight in the Panther's Skin
Demetrius I
Shen Khar Venakhi (tr: "You are vineyard")
Ioane Shavteli
Abdulmesiani (tr: "Slave of the Messiah")

Germanic languages

Alliterative verse 
Beowulf
Elder Edda
Younger Edda
skald
scop

Medieval English poetry
Middle English
Geoffrey Chaucer
The Canterbury Tales
William Langland
Piers Plowman
Everyman
Sir Orfeo
Book of the Civilized Man
The Pearl Poet
Sir Gawain and the Green Knight

Medieval German poetry
minnesang
Walther von der Vogelweide
The Nibelungenlied

Medieval Greek poetry
Acritic songs
Digenis Acritas
Song of Armouris

Medieval Celtic poetry

Welsh 
Aneirin Y Gododdin
Taliesin
Llywarch Hen
Dafydd ap Gwilym

Irish
Metrical Dindshenchas
Lebor Gabála Érenn
Táin Bó Cúailnge
Contention of the bards
see also: Irish poetry

Further reading 
 Wilhelm,  James J., (editor), Lyrics of the Middle Ages : an anthology, New York : Garland Pub., 1990. 

 
Poetry movements